Billa is a 2007 Indian Tamil-language action thriller film directed by Vishnuvardhan. It is a remake of the 1978 Hindi film Don. The film stars Ajith Kumar who plays a double role as an underworld don and his friendly look-alike alongside Nayanthara and Namitha, while Prabhu, Rahman, Adithya Menon, and Santhanam playing supporting roles. It is produced by L. Suresh and Abdurrahman M while featuring a score and soundtrack by Yuvan Shankar Raja, cinematography by Nirav Shah and editing by A. Sreekar Prasad.

The project commenced in April 2007 and was released and distributed worldwide by Ayngaran International on 14 December 2007. The film, upon release, emerged highly successful, and was selected to be screened at the 61st Cannes Film Festival.

Plot
David Billa is a crime boss featured on Interpol's criminal list, who is hiding and operating out of Malaysia. DSP Jayaprakash has spent the last few years looking for Billa, leaving behind a life in India. During a chase with the police, Billa is severely wounded after an accident and dies in front of Jayaprakash, who secretly holds a burial of Billa. Interpol officer Gokulnath is assigned to work with Jayaprakash to capture elusive Billa as no-one knows of Billa's death. Jayaprakash keeps Billa's death as a secret even from his fellow officers, and tracks down a look-alike called Saravana Velu, a hotel server and small-time petty thief. He asks Velu to infiltrate Billa's gang by pretending to be Billa. In return, he will make sure that the child Velu adopted, Karan gets a proper education. 

Jayaprakash trains Velu and sends him back to Billa's gang, disguised as an amnesiac Billa, who had been hiding at an apartment complex due to his injuries. Slowly, Velu starts to learn about Billa's gang and even speaks to Jagdish, Billa's boss on the phone. Velu provides a pen drive with the secret information of the crime network to Jayaprakash, but he is about to be killed by Sasha because her brother Rajesh as well as his fiancée Rhea were killed by Billa earlier. At this juncture, Jayaprakash arrives and tells her that he is Velu and not Billa. Later before a party, Velu secretly provides information to Jayaprakash about a meeting of Billa's network and C.J., Billa's girlfriend, overhears his conversation. She confronts Velu, but in the struggle, he accidentally kills her. 

A shootout occurs at the party, and Jayaprakash is killed by Jagdish, leaving his gun behind. Velu finds the Jayaprakash dead and the gun, but is taken into the custody of the police team, now headed by Gokulnath. He argues during interrogation that he is Velu and not Billa to Gokulnath. Velu mentions a piece of evidence – the pen drive, which may prove his innocence, but the pen drive is nowhere to be found. Unable to prove his innocence, Velu escapes from a police van and phones Gokulnath, where he asks him to meet at the Aero bridge, where it is revealed that Gokulnath is none other than Jagdish and was the one who killed Jayaprakash. Officer Anil Menon apparently had the pen drive all along and strikes a deal with Velu to get hold of Jagdish. 

Meanwhile, Sasha and Karan have been kidnapped by Jagdish and wants the pen drive in return for them. Velu meets Ranjith and gives him a second pen drive with the same data, but corrupted. When Ranjith tries to kill Velu, a scuffle ensues, making Ranjith fall from the top. In a final confrontation, Jagdish fights with Velu. Jagdish posing as Gokulnath, asks the police to arrest Velu as Billa but gets shot by the squad of police and dies as the police have wired the entire conversation between Jagdish and Velu, thus proving his innocence. Velu finally hands over the original pen drive to Officer Menon and joins Sasha and Karan.

Cast

Production

Development
The entire production stage of the movie spanned about six months. Prior to Billa, Vishnuvardhan had directed three films, Kurumbu, Arinthum Ariyamalum and Pattiyal, two of which were successful. Billa was started after a debacle surrounding his other venture, Sarvam, which was eventually postponed to make way for Billa.

In an interview, Vishnuvardhan said that he had "twice missed out on the chance to direct [Kumar]. The third time when I got a chance to direct him, I made sure that I would not miss it. I was all ready to write a good script for him, but he said, he wanted me to remake Billa", confirming it was Ajith's idea.

The film was originally announced, provisionally after the release of the Bollywood film, Don – which was a remake of the 1978 film of the same name. Also from the 1978 version, a remake was made in 1980 in Tamil, called Billa. 2007's Billa drew inspirations from these three versions. Suresh Balaji, who had acted in the earliest version of Billa, acquired the rights to produce the film. It became the second Tamil film to be remade from the 1978 version, after Naan Avanillai.

After the official announcement of the production company, the director and the cameraman, Vishnuvardhan and Nirav Shah began to select other members of the cast and the crew to be a part of the Billa team. Ajith could not assist in helping choose the other members. On 13 April 2007, the eve of Tamil New Year's Day, the launch of Billa took place at the AVM studios in Vadapalani, Chennai. Among the attendees were the stars of the old cast, Rajinikanth, Sripriya, Suresh Balaji as well as noted directors Mani Ratnam, Dharani, K. S. Ravikumar, and Saran. The confirmed cast until the date of the launch also were invited, among them Ajith along with his wife, Shalini, Nayanthara, Namitha and Prabhu.

Filming

Apart from the casting of Ajith in the dual lead role, previously played by Rajinikanth, the rest of the cast took nearly four months to finalise. The role played by Sripriya in the original was given to Nayantara in early 2007, controversially after Bollywood actress, Isha Sharvani, who had been in contention to act in the last few movies of Kumar, was paid the advance. Vishnuvardhan reported that he was pleased with Nayanthara's role in E and subsequently opted for her. The other lead female role in the film was initially written for Shriya Saran, but due to her contract with Sivaji: The Boss, she refused to accept the film. Despite other actresses such as Trisha, Reema Sen, Asin and Bhanu being considered, the role was eventually given to Pooja Umashankar. However, she refused the role, citing that she was reluctant to appear in a bikini, as the role required. Subsequently, Namitha was signed up for the role. Nayanthara was later finalized as the female lead.

The remaining members of the cast were selected after the launch, which was held on 13 April 2007. Despite early reports of Prakash Raj playing the role enacted by K. Balaji of an inspector in the original, the role was eventually secured by Prabhu. The role of the comedian was tipped to go Vadivelu, after he received rave reviews for his comic chemistry in Chandramukhi with Rajinikanth. However, despite the reviews, Vishnuvardhan's regular pattern meant that the spotlight for a comedian would be limited. Santhanam replaced him. Another character artiste, Adithya, also signed up to be one of the members of the police troupe, as did Malayalam actor Rahman, who with Billa made his comeback into Tamil cinema. The item number danced by Helen in the original was originally given to Mumaith Khan, but was later changed to newcomer Rose Dawn, for unknown reasons.

For his crew, Vishnuvardhan picked his preferred technicians, with Rajkannan as the dialogue writer, Nirav Shah as the cinematographer, William Ong as the stunt master, Thota Tharani as the art director, Pa. Vijay as the chief lyricist and A. Sreekar Prasad as the editor. Vishnuvardhan's orthodox music composer, Yuvan Shankar Raja, was chosen, creating great expectations for the project, while Vishnuvardhan's wife, Anu Vardhan, worked as a costume designer. Majority of the film was shot in Malaysia at locations including Langkawi, Kuala Lumpur overlooking the Petronas Towers and other parts, while a few scenes were shot at the Binny Mills in Chennai.

Soundtrack

For the film's music and soundtrack, Vishnuvardhan renewed his previous association (Kurumbu, Arinthum Ariyamalum and Pattiyal) with Yuvan Shankar Raja. The soundtrack has six songs, and the lyrics were penned by Pa. Vijay. Since the film was a remake, two songs from the original soundtrack, composed by M. S. Viswanathan, were remixed and included in the soundtrack. The formal release of the soundtrack was held on 21 November 2007 at Hotel Residence Towers in Chennai. Yuvan Shankar Raja reused some of the background music of his previous ventures Kedi and Vallavan in Billa. The album achieved record audio sales. Sify reported that it took the "best ever audio opening" for an Ajith film and the second highest opening day sales recorded in 2007 after Sivaji: The Boss. Nearly 22,000 CDs and cassettes were said to be sold out by the first day evening all over Tamil Nadu.

The album received very positive reviews. Pavithra Srinivasan from Rediff noted that Billas music "rocks" and gave it four out of five. The reviewer wrote: "Yuvan Shankar Raja has etched an intricate musical feast to complement the tale – and quite a feast it's turned out to be, a la the original". A reviewer from Indiaglitz.com wrote that the track was a "masterly work from young Yuvan... [which]... takes us to a different world", while a reviewer from Behindwoods wrote that it was the "soul of the film" which "stands out as the highlight of the album, giving that eerie feel required of a film about a don" and an "interesting composition with arrangements that spell international quality".

Marketing
The satellite rights of the film were bought by Kalaignar TV. Its television premiere occurred on the occasion of Diwali in 27 October 2008.

Reception

Box office
The film was released in over 200 screens in Tamil Nadu and 50 screens overseas. The film was made on a budget of ₹15 crore (worth ₹61 crore in 2021 prices) and sold to Ayngaran International for ₹25 crore. In its opening weekend, Billa collected about 3 crores. In Chennai alone it collected ₹5.2 crore. The film completed a 175-day run at theatres and was declared a blockbuster. It is reported to have sold 1 crore tickets in India. In Kerala, it collected more than the usual top Malayalam films of the year..It was highest grossing Ajith film at that time unitill release of  Mankatha  and was the second highest grossing tamil movie behined Sivaji the boss

Critical response
Billa opened to primarily positive critical response. Sify lauded the film, writing: Billa delivers the goods with its great star cast, a designer look, technical glitz, perfect chemistry making it an entertainment extravaganza". The reviewer claimed that it was the "first designer-look Kollywood film with classy action cuts" and a "technically chic, racy, engrossing entertainer with a Hollywood look", going on to call it "racy & rocking". The critic also heaped praise on the lead actor: "Ajith looks sensational and clearly he is at home, playing dual roles of Billa and Velu. He is suave, dashing, and debonair and has a terrific screen presence which makes the film work big time. You just cannot think of any other actor in Tamil donning the role made memorable by Rajinikanth". Behindwoods rated the film 3.5 out of 5 and wrote: "...where Vishnu Vardhan scores is in his crystal clear vision. He doesn’t want to challenge the original nor change its content. All he wants to do is to repackage it stylishly for today’s trend with some present avant-garde styles in film making. The deliberate attempts by the director not to follow the super star’s style are palpable in every frame, which has made Billa stand out tall and high". In regard of Ajith's presence, the reviewer said: "Ajith as the ruthless David Billa is a revelation. Stylish, menacing and electrifying, he seems to have thoroughly enjoyed the challenge and has completely lived up to it. Rajinikanth can definitely be proud of his successor he has chosen for the tough job".

Mythili Ramachandran of Nowrunning.com wrote: "Billa ... lives up to its hype and Ajith simply rocks", rating it 3 out of 5. Another reviewer from the same site, gave the same rating, citing: "Billa ... is slick and stylish in keeping with the present modern world...View the movie from a technical angle, and it is undoubtedly in par with Hollywood movies. What a pulsating thriller it has turned out to be". In contrast, TSV Hari from Rediff wrote that the film "disappoints" and gave it 2.5 out of 5, further claiming: "Director Vishnuvardhan seems to have been in a dilemma as to whether to focus on Ajith or give the film well-etched characters. There are too many diversions in the form of female cleavages in the rain forests of Malaysia and garish sets". Balaji, who portrayed the DSP in the 1980 film, praised the 2007 film for being "very stylish and looking grand", but expressed his dismay over the absence of the characters previously played by Thengai Srinivasan, S. A. Ashokan and Manorama.

Prequel 

In 2008, reports claimed that, following the film's commercial success, Soundarya Rajinikanth was planning to make a sequel, to be produced by Ocher Studios in association with Warner Bros. However, the sequel did not materialise, and the idea was dropped, with Ajith Kumar, Vishnuvardhan and Soundarya getting busy with other projects.

In mid-2010, sources confirmed that Vishnuvardhan had finished penning the script for a prequel and that Ajith Kumar would reprise the titular character. The project became officially announced in late 2010, after Ajith Kumar signed up and first production poster were published to the media. Suresh Balaje, son of producer and actor K. Balaje, who produced the original Billa with Rajinikanth, and George Pius from Wide Angle Creations banner, were confirmed as the producer, who associated with Mumbai-based IN Entertainment Limited, a Hinduja group company. However, in a turn of events, Vishnuvardhan was replaced by Chakri Toleti, and a new script was written by Toleti and his assistants. The prequel was released at 13 July 2012 to underwhelming reviews, eventually being deemed as a box office failure.

References

External links

Bibliography
 

2007 films
Films about organised crime in India
Tamil remakes of Hindi films
Indian action thriller films
Films directed by Vishnuvardhan (director)
Films scored by Yuvan Shankar Raja
Indian gangster films
2000s Tamil-language films
Reboot films
Films shot in Malaysia
Films set in Malaysia
Films with screenplays by Salim–Javed
2007 action thriller films
Films about lookalikes
Tamil films remade in other languages